Woman is a 2019 documentary by French environmentalist Yann Arthus-Bertrand and Ukrainian director Anastasia Mikova.

Synopsis
The film is based on interviews with 2,000 women from 50 countries, and covers the status of women all over the world. The topics covered include forced marriages, sexual assault, female genital mutilation, acid attacks, motherhood, sexuality, menstruation, education and the professional success of women.

Awards
Woman was nominated for Best International Documentary at the 2019 Bergen International Film Festival. It won the Sfera 1932 Award at the 76th Venice International Film Festival.

References

External links
 Official Website
 

2019 films
2019 documentary films
Films directed by Yann Arthus-Bertrand
French documentary films
2010s French films